Hans-Dieter "Timo" Zahnleiter (born 16 December 1948) is a German former professional football player and manager who played as a midfielder.

Playing career
Zahnleiter started his professional career in 1967 when he played for VfR Mannheim until 1971. He spent the next three years in 1860 Munich, a 2. Bundesliga team at the time, where in 1973 he suffered from injuries. In the summer of 1974, he moved to Greece and transferred to AEK Athens along with fellow countryman Walter Wagner. Zahnleiter played in the center and was distinguished mainly for his blocking skills, however, from the second year he was placed on the left end of the defense by František Fadrhonc, since the latter believed that this way AEK would achieve more beauty in their game. At AEK he suffered from injuries again and finally in 1977 he was released and returned to Germany to undergo surgery. Afterwards, he played for one year in VfR Bürstadt and for two years in Wormatia Worms where he also completed his football career.

Managerial career
Zahnleiter began his coaching career in 1983, as an assistant in Darmstadt 98 in the 2. Liga, while in 1984 he joined the coaching staff of 1. FC Köln again as an assistant. Then he had a spell at Eintracht Frankfurt until 1989 and other German teams such as Viktoria Aschaffenburg, Energie Cottbus, VfB Marburg and Rot-Weiß Walldorf until 1994 and in 1995 he returned to Greece on behalf of PAS Giannina. Subsequently, and in successive order, he assumed the technical leadership of Ethnikos Piraeus, Ethnikos Asteras and Anagennisi Karditsa, but without any remarkable success. In January 1999, he was removed from Anagennisi Karditsa due to poor results and then returned to Germany, being the coach of SV Seckenheim at the Landesliga from 2005 to 2008 period.

References

External links
 Timo Zahnleiter at eintracht-archiv.de

1948 births
Living people
Footballers from Mannheim
German footballers
Association football midfielders
Bundesliga managers
2. Bundesliga players
Super League Greece players
VfR Mannheim players
TSV 1860 Munich players
AEK Athens F.C. players
VfR Bürstadt players
Wormatia Worms players
German football managers
Eintracht Frankfurt managers
Viktoria Aschaffenburg managers
FC Energie Cottbus managers
PAS Giannina F.C. managers
Ethnikos Piraeus F.C. managers
Ethnikos Asteras F.C. managers
Anagennisi Karditsa F.C. managers
German expatriate footballers
German expatriate football managers
German expatriate sportspeople in Greece
Expatriate footballers in Greece
Expatriate football managers in Greece